Children of the Sun is a dieselpunk tabletop role-playing game created by the now defunct Misguided Games, Inc. in 2002. Set on Krace, an island of giant, supernaturally tough trees, it was part of a generation of dieselpunk settings that appeared beginning in the late 1990s. Most notable about the game was its original Token System, which allowed the player to use a token to determine initiative and to interrupt other character's turns.

External links 
Children of the Sun - Misguided Games (Official site), archived by the Internet Archive January 27, 2007 (last update)
GameReport.com Interview with Lewis Pollak about Children of the Sun
RPGnet review

References 

Fantasy role-playing games
Science fiction role-playing games
Role-playing games introduced in 2002
Dieselpunk